Alicia Agut (September 7, 1929 – April 7, 2017) was a Spanish actress.

Biography 
In 1950, Agut began to work mainly in the theater and appear in films and television in the 1960s. She is known for her performance in the cinema such as Amantes , La flor de mi Secreto and El animated forest. Agut became popular in series such as Hospital Central (2000) and Pelotas (2009).

Agut died on April 7, 2017 in Madrid, at the age of 87 due to respiratory complications.

Filmography

Theater 
 1950: La vida es sueño by Pedro Calderón de la Barca
 1953: El Jardín de Falerina
1954: Julieta o la clave de los sueños
 1957: Los Triunfos Del Amor
 1961: Misterio En El Círculo Rojo De Antonio Samons
 1963: La Alegría De Vivir

Cinema 
 Death Penalty
 The Animated Forest
 El Lute
 Lovers
 The Flower Of My Secret
 Tierra

Television 
 Ficciones
 Lecciones De Tocador
 La Forja De Un Rebelde
 Anillos De Oro
 Manolito Gafotas
 El Comisario
 Hospital Central
 Pelotas

References

External links 

1929 births
2017 deaths
20th-century Spanish actresses
Spanish film actresses
Spanish television actresses